Sunrise English Medium is a co-educational school in Belur, Howrah, West Bengal, India that was established in 1975 by Sri Raghunath Prasad.

References

External links
 

Private schools in West Bengal
Primary schools in West Bengal
High schools and secondary schools in West Bengal
Schools in Howrah district
Educational institutions established in 1975
1975 establishments in West Bengal